Cougar Town is an American sitcom television series that premiered on September 23, 2009 on the American Broadcasting Company (ABC). The pilot premiered after Modern Family. On October 8, 2009, ABC announced that Cougar Town had been picked up for a full season. On May 8, 2012, ABC canceled the series after three seasons. Two days later, TBS picked up the series for a fourth season.

The series, set somewhere along Florida's Gulf Coast, follows the life of Jules Cobb (Courteney Cox), a recently divorced woman in her forties facing the often humorous challenges, pitfalls and rewards of life's next chapter, along with her son, ex-husband, and wine-loving friends who together make up her dysfunctional, but supportive and caring extended family.

Episode 36, "A Thing About You", was broadcast in Canada on January 12 as originally scheduled but was subject to a short-notice preemption in the U.S. and was shown on ABC January 19, 2011. The vast majority of the episodes, except for the pilot and the episode "Everything Man", are titled after songs by Tom Petty, who is from Florida.

Series overview

Episodes

Season 1 (2009–10)

Season 2 (2010–11)

Season 3 (2012)

Season 4 (2013)

Season 5 (2014)

Season 6 (2015)

Ratings

References 

General references 
 
 
 

 
Lists of American sitcom episodes